Convention on Road Traffic can refer to:

 The Convention on Road Traffic signed in Geneva in 1949, commonly known as the 'Geneva Convention on Road Traffic'
 The Convention on Road Traffic signed in Vienna in 1968, commonly known as the 'Vienna Convention on Road Traffic'